Mohammedan Sporting Club Limited Dhaka, founded in 1936 at Dhaka, is one of the oldest and one of the most popular football clubs in Bangladesh, with a support base in all parts of the country. The club currently plays in the Bangladesh Premier League.

History

The clubs journey began in Hazaribagh. Members of the famed Nawab family of Dhaka wanted to establish a local club for the youth. As a result, Muslim Sports Club came into being in 1927. Nine years later, with Khwaja M. Ajmal as its president, it was renamed Mohammedan Sporting Club, after its more renowned predecessor the Kolkata Mohammedan.

Though it was established to create enthusiasm for sports amongst the local Muslim community, the club later broke the race, class and ethnic barrier and became a crowd favorite.

In the late 40s, MSC started to flourish with Mohammad Shahjahan at the helm. Shahjahan left Kolkata Mohammedan and came to Bangladesh after the partition. The 1950s was a time for Dhaka Wanderers. They were the top dog in the sporting arena. In 1956, some of their star players and senior officials joined MSC and started restructuring the club. The results were evident as MSC secured their first league title in 1957. The same year they won the Independence Cup, thus ensuring their domestic double. The trophies kept coming over the next two decades.

Before independence, Mohammedan also clinched the Dhaka League title in the year of 1959, '61, '63, '66 and '69. It was not easy to find success against teams like Dhaka Wanderers and Victoria SC. Yet, Mohammedan did not yield to failure, they pursued their way. Mohammedan won the Aga Khan Gold Cup for the first time in 1959. They repeated the feat twice, in 1964 and 1968.

On 11 May 1972, Mohammedan played against Indian club Mohun Bagan under captaincy of Zakaria Pintoo, which was the first visit of a foreign team in independent Bangladesh. Dhaka Abahani adds a new dimension to domestic football in the post-independent era. And it begins a new rivalry involving Dhaka Abahani and Dhaka Mohammedan termed Dhaka Derby which took no time to spread the passion and madness throughout the country. Abahani won the league in 1974 and 1977 but the decade, however, belonged to Mohammedan as they got the better of their hardcore rival to win the league in 1975, 1976, 1978 and 1980.

They were unbeaten in the first division league from 8 September 1985 to 15 March 1990. Mohammedan did not lose a single match in those one thousand six hundred and fifty days winning 63 of them, drawing 12 times and 1 ended up being postponed. They scored 160 and conceded 22 goals. The Black and Whites took the league title three times in a row from 1986 to 1988. The last time Mohammedan won the league was back in 2002 and with all these years gone, they are still the most number of league winners in Bangladesh- 19 times.

Mohammedan won the Federation Cup ten times, beating Abahani six times in the final. They won their last Federation Cup title back in 2009. Mohammedan also won the most expensive domestic football tournament of the country, Super Cup twice by taking the inaugural edition in 2009 and then the one in 2013. Their record attendance for a football game is nearly 45,000 which took place in 2009.

They had their touch on Independence Cup title three times in 1972, 1991 and 2014 with the latest triumph being their last title in any domestic competition thus far.

Dhaka Mohammedan was the most dominating force in continental competitions among Bangladeshi clubs as well. They made it to the Asian Club Championship (the then Asian Champions League) finals in 1988 thus becoming the first-ever Bangladeshi club to do so. They participated in this tournament a record six times making it to the finals thrice, a record yet to be matched by any South Asian club.

Rivalries

Dhaka Derby

The Dhaka Derby is a football rivalry between Abahani and Dhaka Mohammedan, although the rivalry was bigger in the past. Dhaka Mohammedan and Dhaka Abahani first met each other during 1973 Dhaka League. Before Abahani's arrival, Mohammedan where the most dominant force in the country, and overthrew their previous rivals Dhaka Wanderers Club, by becoming the team with most league titles won.

Shirt sponsors

Crest and colours

Stadium
 
From the 2019–2020 season the club started playing their matches at the 18,000 capacity Shaheed Dhirendranath Stadium. On 7 March 2020, Mohammedan Sporting Club hogging the spotlight with a 1–0 win over defending champions Bashundhara Kings in their home debut. Nigerian forward Obi Moneke's 25th-minute strike, a superb curling effort from the edge of the box, proving to be enough to split the sides.

Current squad

Dhaka Mohammedan squad for 2022-23 season.

Personnel

Current technical staff

Board of directors
.

Team records

Head Coach's record

Honours

League
 Dhaka League  
Winners (19): 1957, 1959, 1961, 1963, 1965, 1966, 1969, 1975, 1976, 1978, 1980, 1982, 1986, 1987, 1988–89, 1993, 1996, 1999, 2002

Cup
 Federation Cup 
Winners (10): 1980*, 1981, 1982*, 1983, 1987, 1989, 1995, 2002, 2008, 2009
 Independence Cup 
Winners (3): 1972, 1991, 2014
 Super Cup 
Winners (2): 2009, 2013
 National Championship 
Winners (2): 2001–02, 2005–06
  DMFA Cup: 
Winners (2):  1993, 1995

Invitational
 Aga Khan Gold Cup 
Winners (3): 1959, 1964*, 1968
 All Airlines Gold Cup
Winners (1): 1999
 Ashis-Jabbar Shield Tournament
Winners (1): 1982
 Bordoloi Trophy
Runners-up (1): 1989
 IFA Shield
Runners-up (1): 1995

Performance in AFC competitions

 Asian Club Championship/AFC Champions League: 6 Appearances

 1987 : Qualifying Round
 1988–89 : Semi Final League
 1989–90 : Qualifying Round
 1990–91 : Quarter-finals
 1991 : Group Stage
 1997–98 : First Round
 Asian Cup Winners' Cup: 4 Appearances
 1990–91 : Second Round
 1992–93 : Intermediate Round
 1993–94 : Second Round
 1996–97 : Second Round
 AFC Cup: 1 Appearance

 2006 : Group Stage

Notable players

The players below had senior international cap(s) for their respective countries. Players whose name is listed, represented their countries before or after playing for Mohammedan Sporting Club (Dhaka).

Asia
  Abdul Ghafoor (1961; 1965–1969)
   Mohammed Rahmatullah (1962–63)
   Balai Dey (1962; 1963–64)
  Ganesh Thapa (1981–1986)
  Nasser Hejazi (1986–87)
  Bijan Taheri (1987–89)
  Reza Naalchegar (1987–89)
  Azamat Abduraimov (1991–92)

Africa
  Emeka Ezeugo (1987–89)
  Yassan Ouatching (2021)

See also
Kolkata Mohammedan
Chittagong Mohammedan

Notes

References

External links
  (archived)
 

Mohammedan SC (Dhaka)
Association football clubs established in 1936
Sport in Bangladesh
Football clubs in Bangladesh